Hope & Sorrow is a full-length album by French hip hop producer Wax Tailor. It was released in 2007 on Lab'Oratoire, and licensed for release in North America by Le Plan and in Australia by Blend Corp.

Track listing

Credits 
All tracks composed, sampled and programmed by JC Le Saout, mixed by JC Le Saout.

Additional musicians
Marina Quaisse: Cello on "The Man with No Soul", "Positively Inclined", "To Dry Up"
Bejamin Bouton: Guitar & Bass on "The Games You Play"
Helene Cervero: Flute on "The Man with No Soul", "Positively Inclined", "To Dry Up", "There Is Danger"

Samples
"Once upon a Past" contains a sample of "Can I Get an Amen" by Nate Harrison
"The Tune" contains a sample of "Bye Bye Love" by The Everly Brothers
"Beyond Words" contains a sample of "Black Coffee" by Rosemary Clooney
"To Dry Up" contains a sample of "Mon Amour, Mon Ami" by Marie Laforêt
"We Be" contains a sample of "Dem Niggers Ain't Playing" by the Watts Prophets

References

Wax Tailor albums
2005 albums